The 57th Infantry Regiment "Abruzzi" is an active unit of the Italian Army based in Capua in Campania. The unit is part of the Italian army's infantry corps and operationally assigned to the Division "Acqui".

History 
The regiment was formed on 16 April 1861 as 57th Regiment and assigned with its sister regiment the 58th Regiment to the Brigade "Abruzzi".

Italo-Turkish War 
In November 1911 the regiment together with the 79th Regiment of the Brigade "Roma" was sent to Cyrenaica to fight in the Italo-Turkish War. On 12 March 1912 and 18 June 1913 the regiment fought hard battles against Ottoman Army forces. For each of the two battles the regiment was awarded a Silver Medal of Military Valour.

World War I 
The Brigade "Abruzzi" fought on the Italian front in World War I, earning a third Silver Medal of Military Valour during the Sixth Battle of the Isonzo. On 14 August 1917 the regiment was awarded the French Croix de guerre avec Palme de bronze by the President of France Raymond Poincaré during his visit to the Italian front.
 
On 31 December 1926 the brigade was disbanded and its two regiments were transferred to the other brigades: the 57th Infantry Regiment "Abruzzi" to the IX Infantry Brigade and the 58th Infantry Regiment "Abruzzi" to the X Infantry Brigade, which was the infantry component of the 10th Territorial Division of Padua. In 1934 the division changed its name to 10th Infantry Division "Piave".

On 15 May 1939 the 57th Infantry Regiment "Abruzzi" was reunited with its sister regiment and assigned to the 10th Infantry Division "Piave". On the same date the two infantry regiments changed their names to "Piave".

World War II 

In early February 1941 the division moved to Sicily, where it received additional materiel to become a "motorized division". On 27 March 1941 the Piave was sent to the province of Udine on the Italian-Yugoslav border in preparation for the Invasion of Yugoslavia. Once hostilities ended the division moved to Liguria arrived in May 1941. Between 21 June and 15 July 1941 the division was fully motorized and changed its name on the latter date to 10th Motorized Division "Piave", while the division's two infantry regiments changed designation to motorized infantry regiment.

On 12 November 1942 the Piave moved to the area between Saint-Tropez and Grimaud in Southern France as part of the Axis occupation of France.

Between 1–10 January 1943 the division returned to Italy and tasked to guard the Northern approaches of Rome. After Armistice of Cassibile was announced on 8 September 1943 the Piave fought German forces at Ponte del Grillo, north of Monterotondo. After negotiations with the German command, the Piave was transferred to the control of the municipal council of Rome and performed police duties in the city until the Germans dissolved the division on 23 September 1943.

Cold War 
With the 1975 army reform the Italian Army abolished the regimental level and battalions came under direct command of the brigades and regional commands. Therefore, on 1 December 1975, the I Battalion of the 80th Infantry (Recruits Training) Regiment "Roma" in Sora was reformed as 57th Motorized Infantry Battalion "Abruzzi". The battalion was assigned the flag and traditions of the 57th Infantry Regiment "Abruzzi" and joined the Motorized Brigade "Acqui".

On 2 March 1991 the battalion became a training unit and moved to Sulmona, where it was renamed 57th Battalion "Abruzzi". On 1 April 2006 the battalion became second battalion of the 123rd Volunteer Training Regiment "Chieti".

On 27 September 2012 the 123rd Volunteer Training Regiment "Chieti" was disbanded and the 57th Battalion "Abruzzi" came under direct control of the Training Units Grouping. On 1 April 2013 the 57th Battalion "Abruzzi"was disbanded and the flag of the 57th Infantry Regiment "Abruzzi" was transferred to the Shrine of the Flags in the Vittoriano in Rome.

2022 Reactivation 
On 4 October 2022 the flag and traditions of the 57th Infantry Regiment "Abruzzi" were given to the Command and Tactical Supports Unit "Acqui" of the Division "Acqui".

As of reactivation the unit is organized as follows:

  57th Command and Tactical Supports Unit "Abruzzi", in Capua
 Command Company
 Tactical and Logistic Support Battalion
 Deployment Support Company
 Transport Company

See also 
 Division "Acqui"

External links
 Italian Army Website: 57th Command and Tactical Supports Unit "Abruzzi"

References

Infantry Regiments of Italy
Military units and formations established in 1861